One More Time is the second album by the Swedish pop group One More Time and was released in 1994. The album did not continue the international success of the group's first album, and One More Time did not enter the Swedish Albums Chart.

Three songs were released as singles; "Song of Fête", "Get Out" and "The Dolphin". The first song was the only one that entered the Swedish Singles Chart, where it peaked at number 36.

Dazzle Light was a re-recording of a song included on one of Sound of Music's album (both Peter Grönvall and Nanne Grönvall were members of Sound of Music and One More Time).

Track listing
Symphony of Doom
Get Out
The Dolphin
Anguish Kept in Secrecy
Song of Fête
Time
Moments of Passion
Dazzle Light
Chance of a Lifetime
Fairytale

References

One More Time (band) albums
1994 albums